is a railway station on the JR East Tsugaru Line located in the town of Imabetsu, Aomori Prefecture, Japan. It is 48.6 rail kilometers from the southern terminus of the Tsugaru Line at Aomori Station.

Lines

Station layout
Ōkawadai Station has one ground-level side platform serving a single bi-directional track. The station is unattended.

History
Ōkawadai Station was opened on October 21, 1958 as a station on the Japanese National Railways (JNR). With the privatization of the JNR on April 1, 1987, it came under the operational control of JR East.

Surrounding area
Ōkawadai Elementary School

See also
 List of Railway Stations in Japan

External links

 

Stations of East Japan Railway Company
Railway stations in Aomori Prefecture
Tsugaru Line
Imabetsu, Aomori
Railway stations in Japan opened in 1958